George Dunbar may refer to:
George Dunbar (classical scholar) (1774–1851), Scottish classical scholar and lexicographer
George Harrison Dunbar (1876–1966), Ontario political figure
George Dunbar (Pennsylvania politician) (born 1960), member of the Pennsylvania House of Representatives
George de Dunbar, 11th Earl of March
George Dunbar (MP), Member of the UK Parliament for Belfast
Sir George Dunbar, 2nd Baronet (died 1747), of the Dunbar of Mochrum baronets
Sir George Dunbar, 4th Baronet (died 1799), of the Dunbar of Mochrum baronets
Sir George Dunbar, 5th Baronet (c. 1750–1811), of the Dunbar of Mochrum baronets
Sir George Duff-Sutherland-Dunbar, 6th Baronet (1878–1962) of the Dunbar of Hempriggs baronets